This list of the oldest restaurants in the United States includes currently-operating restaurants that were founded prior to the year 1900. Most of the establishments are located in the Northeastern United States, many of them predate the Civil War, and a handful predate the Revolutionary War.

Disputes 
In 2017, credible evidence was uncovered that indicates New York's legendary Katz's Delicatessen might have been founded in 1911, rather than the popular claim of 1888.

In 2013, credible evidence was uncovered that indicates the fabled story of The Old Clam House in San Francisco is inaccurate. The original story is that it was built in 1861 and is the oldest restaurant in
San Francisco. Recent in depth historical research with concrete evidence has found absolutely
zero information to support this claim. Actual historical evidence proves that it is not on the 1869
topographical map of the area, is not on the 1886 Sanborn fire insurance map, and doesn't show up
until 1891 in the city directories. Also, it is claimed that it was first named the Oakdale Bar, but Oakdale Ave
was first called 15th Ave South, then Teneriffe Street, then lastly Oakdale Ave only after 1910. The 1886 Sanborn fire insurance map shows that the street that eventually became Oakdale Ave
was just a paper street and was not actually graded and opened until some point between 1886 and
1899 based on cross-referencing various Sanborn and street maps. 
The original business was started in 1891 by a Mr. William Brandley as a saloon. Ambrose Zurfluh is touted as
being the founder of the bar but he was actually born in 1861 in Switzerland and didn't migrate to the
United States until 1885. Zurfluh was the second owner and operated the establishment until Charles F
Yaeger took it over in 1912. Perhaps at some point someone either confused Zurfluh's birth date as the
beginning of the bar, or someone switched the 9 to a 6 in the actual 1891 inception of the establishment.
Photos of the original building show 1880s architectural elements. Had it been built in 1861, it would
exhibit 4" clapboard siding and six over six windows. Instead, the building had split pane windows and
1880s era tongue and groove siding.
Whether the business served any food in 1891 is also questionable. Many saloons served both food and
liquor in the 19th century, but since this establishment was listed as just liquors and not saloon suggests
that it was merely a corner store selling liquors. During the prohibition, it was listed as a “soft drink”
establishment, further indicating it was not yet a restaurant.
The city directories indicate that it did not become a restaurant until 1940 and the first documented use of the name “Old Clam House” is a 1949 newspaper article in the San Francisco Examiner.

Closures 
Samuel Cole opened the first tavern in America, Cole's Inn, on March 4, 1634. It was on Washington St. (now Downtown Crossing) in Boston MA. The building was destroyed by fire in 1711.

The Jacob Wirth Restaurant founded in 1868 operated for 150 years before permanently closing on June 9, 2018, after a fire damaged the building.

On January 12, 2019, another Boston landmark Durgin-Park closed its doors after operating for nearly 192 years, one of America's oldest restaurants founded in 1827.

Jules Maes Saloon, which had been open since 1888 and was possibly the oldest restaurant in Seattle, closed permanently in July 2020 as a result of the coronavirus pandemic.

Buckman Tavern was built in about 1709–1710 by Benjamin Muzzey (1657–1735). With license granted in 1693, it was the first public house in Lexington, Massachusetts. At the time of the Battles of Lexington and Concord (April 19, 1775) it was owned by his great-granddaughter and her husband John Buckman. Several dozen militiamen gathered at the tavern to await the arrival of the British troops. It is now a museum.

Oldest restaurants in the United States

See also 
 Tavern
 Inn

References 

Lists of restaurants
Economy-related lists of superlatives
Lists of longest-duration things